Theclopsis murex is a Neotropical butterfly in the family Lycaenidae first described by Hamilton Herbert Druce in 1907. It is found in the Brazilian states of Rio Grande do Sul and Rio de Janeiro.

References

Theclinae